Frank O'Neill (born 30 September 1926) is an Australian former swimmer. He competed in three events at the 1952 Summer Olympics and at the 1950 British Empire Games.

References

External links
 

1926 births
Living people
Australian male freestyle swimmers
Australian male backstroke swimmers
People from Manly, New South Wales
Sportsmen from New South Wales
Olympic swimmers of Australia
Swimmers at the 1952 Summer Olympics
Commonwealth Games medallists in swimming
Commonwealth Games silver medallists for Australia
Swimmers at the 1950 British Empire Games
20th-century Australian people
Medallists at the 1950 British Empire Games